St. James is a Lutheran (originally Catholic) church in Rothenburg ob der Tauber, Germany, which serves as a church on the pilgrimage route to St. James Church in Santiago de Compostela, Spain. It has two towers (south tower: 55.2 m, 57.7 m north tower).

History and description
The church was built between 1311-1484. Its east chancel was completed in 1322, nave built from 1373-1436, and west choir, which bridges the street, from 1453-1471. The church was consecrated in 1485 by the Bishop of Würzburg. In 1525 the peasant leader Florian Geyer read aloud the articles of the revolting peasants from its west chancel.

Its western gallery contains the famous Holy Blood altarpiece of the Würzburg wood carver Tilman Riemenschneider, carved 1500-1505, (illustrated below) which includes a rock crystal reliquary cross (c. 1270). The altar includes scenes of the entry into Jerusalem (right wing), Lord's Supper (shrine) with Judas as central figure and the Mount of Olives (left wing).

Other important relics include the High Altar (1466 by Friedrich Herlin, a pupil of Rogier van der Weyden ; also known as the Twelve Apostles Altar) in the east choir, which represents on its back side the oldest depiction of the city of Rothenburg and rare images of the Jakobs pilgrim legend, as well as an altar of Tilman Riemenschneider and Mary Coronation altar with sculptures from different centuries, including the Riemenschneider school. The stained glass windows of the east chancel are adorned with valuable images from 1350-1400 AD, including the left window (about 1400) with scenes of the life of the Virgin Mary, central window (circa 1350) with scenes from Christ's life and passion, and right window (about 1400) representing Christ's work of redemption and sacraments.

Great Organ
The great organ in St. Jakob was built by Rieger Orgelbau (Vorarlberg, Austria) in 1968, with 69 stops (108 ranks, c. 5,500 pipes), Tracker action and electric action for the stops. It can be played from the main console (4 manuals and pedal) and from a two-manual console on the back. The specification:

Gallery

References 

 Short Guide to St. Jakobs Lutheran Church in Rothenburg ob der Tauber, undated pamphlet.

External links 

 Tourist Information (German)
 German web site
 Another web site St. Jakob

James
Rothenburg James
Rothenburg James
Sculptures by Tilman Riemenschneider